Max Littmann (3 January 1862 – 20 September 1931) was a German architect.

Littmann was educated in the Gewerbeakademie Chemnitz and the Technische Hochschule Dresden. In 1885, he moved to Munich where he met Friedrich Thiersch and Gabriel von Seidl and where - after two study trips to Italy and Paris - he established himself as a free architect.

In 1891, he joined the contracting business of his father-in-law Jakob Heilmann, thus transforming it into the Heilmann & Littmann general partnership (later becoming a limited partnership), taking charge of the planning department. Littmann excelled in the erection of magnificent buildings, e. g. theaters, department stores and spas and was the perfect supplement to Heilmann, who had specialized in living house construction.

Even during his lifetime, Littmann was listed in the Encyclopaedia Judaica. His pedigree doesn't give any clue on the often referred Jewish descent, rather he is descended from a Protestant family in Oschatz (Saxony), which can be traced back for centuries.

Buildings (selection)
 1896-1897 Hofbräuhaus in Munich
 1898-1900 Kurhaus (spa building) in Bad Reichenhall
 1900-1901 Prinzregententheater in Munich
 1904-1905 Kurtheater in Bad Kissingen
 1905-1906 Schillertheater in Berlin
 1906-1907 Deutsches Nationaltheater in Weimar
 1907-1908 Münchner Künstler-Theater in Munich
 1909–1912 Königlich Württembergisches Hoftheater in Stuttgart (opera house)
 1910-1913 Regentenbau (concert hall) and Wandelhalle (spa building) in Bad Kissingen
 1926-1927 Kurhausbad (spa building) in Bad Kissingen

Bibliography 
 Breuer, Judith: Die Alte Oper in Stuttgart im Kontext der Theaterarchitektur von Max Littmann und der Dekorationsmalerei von Julius Mössel. Eine Ausstellung der Württembergischen Staatstheater im Kleinen Haus (Oberes Foyer) vom 5. Mai bis 11. Juni 1984. Stuttgart 1984.
 Littmann, Max: Das Charlottenburger Schiller-Theater. München: Bruckmann [ca. 1906].
 Littmann, Max: Das Münchner Künstlertheater. München: Werner 1908.
 Littmann, Max: Das Großherzogliche Hoftheater in Weimar. Denkschrift zur Feier der Eröffnung. München: Werner 1908.
 Littmann, Max: Die Königlichen Hoftheater in Stuttgart. Darmstadt: Koch 1912.
 Lux, Joseph August: Das Stadttheater in Posen, erbaut von Max Littmann. Eine Denkschrift. München: Werner 1910.
 Oelwein, Cornelia: Max Littmann (1862–1931). Architekt, Baukünstler, Unternehmer. Michael Imhof Verlag, Petersberg 2013, .
 Schaul, Bernd-Peter: Der Architekt Max Littmann. Sein Beitrag zur Reform des Theaterbaus um 1900. Tübingen: Masch. Diss. 1978.
 Schaul, Bernd-Peter: Das Prinzregententheater in München und die Reform des Theaterbaus um 1900. Max Littmann als Theaterarchitekt. Arbeitshefte des Bayerischen Landesamtes für Denkmalpflege, Bd. 37. 168 S., 174 Abbildungen. München Lipp 1987.
 Wegener, Wilhelm: Die Reformation der Schaubühne: eine technisch-dramaturgische Interpretation der Theaterbauten des Münchner Architekten Max Littmann und ihre Bedeutung für die Entwicklung der deutschen Schaubühne. München 1956 (Diss München 1957).
 Weiss-Vossenkuhl, Dorothea: Das Opernhaus in Stuttgart von Max Littmann (1910–1912). Stuttgart: Klett-Cotta 1983.

 Wolf, Georg Jacob: Max Littmann 1862–1931. Das Lebenswerk eines deutschen Architekten. 68 S., 116 Tafeln. München, Knorr & Hirth 1931.
 Wolf, Georg Jacob: Ingenieur J. Heilmann und das Baugeschäft Heilmann und Littmann. Ein Rückblick auf vierzig Jahre Arbeit. 25 S., 64 Tafeln. München 1911.
 Wolf, Georg Jacob: Das staatlich-städtische Kurmittelhaus Bad Reichenhall erbaut von Architekt Max Littmann, München. Eine Denkschrift. München: Bruckmann 1928.

External links 
 
 Theatres built by Max Littmann

1862 births
1931 deaths
19th-century German architects
TU Dresden alumni
20th-century German architects